The IFAF Junior World Cup took place in 2009 at Canton, Ohio. JWC games between the world’s eight best high school-aged (19 and under) national teams from five continents were played at Canton’s historic Fawcett Stadium, home of the NFL’s annual Pro Football Hall of Fame Game, adjacent to the Hall. The action began on Saturday, June 27 and continued on Wednesday, July 1 and Saturday, July 4, before the Championship Game on Sunday, July 5.

Participants
 (qualified automatically as host)
 (Invitee)
 (Invitee)
 (Winner of North American Playoff)
 (Winner of Oceania Playoff)
  (European champion)
 (European Runner-Up)
 (European 3rd Place)

Seeding
1. 
2. 
3. 
4. 
5. 
6. 
7. 
8.

Bracket

Winners Bracket

Consolation Bracket

Scores

Game Day 1 - June 27

Game Day 2 - July 1

Game Day 3 - July 4

Game Day 4 - July 5

Qualifying
North America:

Oceanic:

Europe: The European teams qualified via the 2008 EFAF European Junior Championship.

See also
IFAF World Cup
IFAF

References

External links
 Official website
 IFAF World Cup blog

IFAF Junior World Cup
IFAF Junior World Cup
IFAF Junior World Cup
American football in Ohio